Aditya Tamang is an Indian politician. He was elected to the Sikkim Legislative Assembly from Soreng-Chakung in the 2019 Sikkim Legislative Assembly election as a member of the Sikkim Krantikari Morcha. He is the son of Prem Singh Tamang, the 6th Chief Minister of Sikkim.

References

1990s births
Living people
Sikkim Krantikari Morcha politicians
People from Namchi district
Sikkim MLAs 2019–2024
Year of birth missing (living people)
Tamang people